The Hispaniolan edible rat (Brotomys voratus) is a recently extinct species of rodent in the family Echimyidae. It is the only species in the genus Brotomys. It was endemic to the island of Hispaniola in the Caribbean, in what is today the Dominican Republic and Haiti. Its natural habitat was subtropical or tropical moist lowland forests.

Description
Brotomys was described by American zoologist Gerrit Smith Miller Jr. in the early 20th century from remains found in archaeological middens of Hispaniola. Miller also identified it with the "mohuy", an animal mentioned by the 16th-century Spanish historiographer and colonial mayor of Santo Domingo, Gonzalo Fernández de Oviedo y Valdés, in his General and Natural History of the Indies (1535):

The erect hair is typical of the Echyimidae, which are called "spiny rats" because of it. The mentioned "hutia" could be the likewise extinct genera Quemisia or Isolobodon, both of greater size than Brotomys.

Despite its highly sought meat, the species is thought to have been primarily driven to extinction by introduced Old World rats rather than human hunting. A mandible of Brotomys was carbon dated to 340 ± 60 years BP (1550-1670 AD), showing it survived the initial Spanish conquest of Hispaniola.

References

Brotomys
Rodent extinctions since 1500
Mammals described in 1916
Taxa named by Gerrit Smith Miller Jr.
Mammals of Hispaniola
Extinct animals of the Dominican Republic
Mammals of the Caribbean
Mammals of the Dominican Republic
Taxonomy articles created by Polbot